Dendrobium victoriae-reginae (Queen Victoria's dendrobium) is a member of the family Orchidaceae endemic to the Philippines.

Dendrobium victoriae-reginae is a small to medium-sized, warm to cold growing epiphyte with thin, descending, clumping pseudobulbs that rarely branch and carry many, unsubdivided, pointed papery leaves, and inflorescences that are violet or purple with a darker tip and white center of 3 to 4 centimeters. It is found in Montane ecoregion of the Philippines growing on moss covered trucks of Lithocarpus species at 1300 to 2700 meters in elevation.

References

External links 
 
 

victoriae-reginae
Endemic orchids of the Philippines
Plants described in 1897